Loxahatchee Groves is a town in Palm Beach County, Florida, United States. As of the 2010 census, the town had a population of 3,180. Loxahatchee Groves was incorporated November 1, 2006, as the 38th municipality in Palm Beach County. The first election for town council members was held on March 13, 2007. The area had been settled since 1917, although Loxahatchee Groves did not become a municipality until 2006. The town bills itself as "Florida's Last Frontier". Loxahatchee Groves was incorporated primarily in order to protect the area from the encroaching urbanization of South Florida, as nearby cities continued to develop and to preserve the area's rural character.

The town derives its name from the Loxahatchee River. "Loxahatchee" is from the Seminole words lowchow (turtle) and hatchee (river), thus translating to "river of turtles". Loxahatchee Groves is bounded on the east by Royal Palm Beach, on the south by Wellington, and on the west and the north by The Acreage and Loxahatchee.

History

After the West Palm Beach Canal (C-51), which connected Lake Okeechobee at Canal Point to West Palm Beach, was completed in 1917, George Frederick Bensel, the Southern States sales manager, envisioned a "waterfront" farming community along the canal. Bensel, and company engineer Torvald Garfield "T. G." Thorgesen, created the first topographical map of Loxahatchee Groves during the following three years. Bensel, Thorgesen, and others then established the Palm Beach Loxahatchee Company, and bought  from the Southern States Land and Timber Company, naming the land "Loxahatchee Farms". The Palm Beach Loxahatchee Company built almost  of canals and roads, which were to be maintained by the Loxahatchee Groves Drainage District, that now is known as the Loxahatchee Groves Water Control District.

Bensel opened a combined gas station, grocery store, and post office in 1925. Loxahatchee Groves received extensive damage during the 1928 Okeechobee hurricane, with almost every home knocked off of its foundations. Bensel's brother Thomas began a project in the 1930s which encouraged the residents to plant citrus, resulting in about 56,000 new trees being planted. A water pump was built at State Road 80 (Southern Boulevard) and D Road during that time. The pump allowed water to be drawn from the West Palm Beach Canal. The Palm Beach Loxahatchee Company sold Loxahatchee Groves to Loxahatchee Investments in 1958.

The production of citrus and tomatoes decreased following George Bensel's death in 1961. Significant development in Royal Palm Beach and Wellington took place in the 1980s and 1990s. Some residents of Loxahatchee Groves believed that the rural lifestyle and the landscape of the area were under threat.

A movement for incorporating Loxahatchee Groves, for the purpose of preserving the rural lifestyle of the area, began in 2003 as a consequence. The residents voted 458–350 in favor of incorporation, on October 10, 2006, making Loxahatchee Groves the 38th municipality in Palm Beach County. The first election for town council members was held on March 13, 2007. Dave Autrey, David Browning, Marge Herzog, Bill Louda, and Dennis Lipp were the first elected council members, while Browning was selected to be mayor and Herzog was chosen to be vice mayor at the first town council meeting on March 29. Prior to the election, a political forum for the candidates was hosted at a naturist resort, drawing a crowd of about 100 people.

Demographics

2020 census

The results of the 2020 United States census: there were 3,355 people; 1,189 households; and 858 families residing in the town.

2010 census

The town had 1,105 households, out of which 9.6% were vacant. 24.4% of the households had children younger than the age of 18 living with them. 55.0% were married couples living together; 8.4% had a female householder with no husband present; and 29.7% were non-families. Approximately 26.1% of the households had an individual who was 65 years of age or older. The average household size was 2.26, and the average family size was 3.02.   3,180 people were living in the town. The racial makeup of the town was: 81.3% White (74.2% were non-Hispanic White), 3.1% African American, 0.3% Native American, 1.6% Asian, 0.0% Pacific Islander, 0.1% from other races, and 1.9% from two or more races. Hispanic or Latino of any race were 18.7% of the population.

Transportation

U.S. routes 98 and 441 and State Road 80 jointly move east-to-west along the southern end of the town, a road which is known locally as Southern Boulevard. Okeechobee Boulevard, designated as State Road 704 to the east of Royal Palm Beach, also runs east-to-west through the town. Palm Tran Route 40, which runs from downtown West Palm Beach to Belle Glade, has a few stops along Southern Boulevard in Loxahatchee Groves and just outside the town limits.

Education

Primary and secondary schools 

The School District of Palm Beach County serves Loxahatchee Groves. Public schools in Loxahatchee Groves and schools serving Loxahatchee Groves include:
Loxahatchee Groves Elementary School
Western Pines Middle School
Seminole Ridge Community High School

Colleges

Palm Beach State College (PBSC) opened a campus in Loxahatchee Groves in February 2017 to serve college students in The Acreage, Loxahatchee, Loxahatchee Groves, Royal Palm Beach, and Wellington. The college was named after former school president Dennis P. Gallon. It features 20 classrooms and computer labs, a large multi-propose room, and a doctor's office simulation room. The campus does not include a cafe, nor a library, nor a bookstore. It is possible that those may be included in the construction of two additional buildings that have been planned, depending on enrollment numbers.

Recreation

Loxahatchee Groves includes the following parks and recreational areas:
Loxahatchee Groves Park
Sunsport Gardens Family Naturist Resort
Lion Country Safari is located just west of the town's boundaries. Lion Country Safari features a drive-through safari park and a walk-through amusement park.

References

External links

Loxahatchee Groves - A private website with information on the town.

Towns in Palm Beach County, Florida
Populated places established in 2006
Towns in Florida
2006 establishments in Florida